The New World is a reference to the Americas and Oceania.

New World may also refer to:

Film and television
 New World (1995 film), a French film about post-World War II France
 The New World (2005 film), a film by Terrence Malick
 The New World (2011 film), an Estonian documentary film
 New World (2013 film), a South Korean crime drama film
 "The New World" (The 4400 episodes)
 "The New World" (Torchwood), a 2011 episode of Torchwood
 Torchwood: Miracle Day or Torchwood: The New World

Music
 New World Records, a record label
 New World Symphony (orchestra), a training academy for orchestra musicians
 New World (band), a band from the 1970s

Albums
 A New World Record, a 1976 album by ELO, Electric Light Orchestra
 New World (Joe Chambers album) (1976)
 New World (Karla Bonoff album) (1988)
 New World (The Zombies album) (1990)
 New World (Do As Infinity album) (2001)
 The New World (Bruce Robison album) (2008)
 New World (Lauri Ylönen album) (2011)
 New World (Dave Kerzner album) (2014)
 New Worlds (album), by Charlotte Hatherley (2009)
 New World, a 1990 album by The Kelly Family
 New World, a 2014 album by Lego Big Morl

Songs
 "New World" (Strawbs song) (1972)
 "New World" (L'Arc-en-Ciel song) (2005)
 "The New World", a 1983 song by X from More Fun in the New World
 "New World", a 1992 song by Soul Asylum from Grave Dancers Union
 "New World", a 1996 songy by Prince from Emancipation
 "New World", a 2000 song by Björk from Selmasongs
 "New World", a 2005 song by tobyMac
 "New World", a 2011 song by Charice from Infinity
 "New World", a 2018 song by Krewella and Yellow Claw ft. Vava

Organisations
 New World (group) or New World Hackers, a hacktivist group
 New World (France), an organized caucus in the French Socialist Party
 New World School of the Arts, a magnet high school in Miami-Dade County, Florida
 New World University, an institution in the Commonwealth of Dominica

Companies
 New World (supermarket), a New Zealand supermarket chain
 New World Amusement Park, former amusement park in Singapore
 New World Development, a Hong Kong-based real estate company
 New World Pasta, a food manufacturer in the US
 New World Pictures, a production company in the US
 Hotel New World, a hotel in Singapore that collapsed in 1986

Publishing
 The New World (newspaper), a New York newspaper of the 1830s and 1840s
 The New World (short story collection), a collection of short stories by Russell Banks
 "The New World" (short story), a short story by Patrick Ness
 Catholic New World, a newspaper of the Diocese of Chicago in the United States
 New World Press, a Chinese book publisher
 New World Translation of the Holy Scriptures, the primary Bible translation used by Jehovah's Witnesses
 The World Tomorrow (magazine) or The New World, a 1918-1934 political magazine
 New World, a set of three science fiction books by James Kahn
 The New World: A Quarterly Review of Religion, Ethics and Theology published by Houghton, Mifflin and Co., c. 1892–1900

Other  uses
 New World ROM, Macintosh computers that do not have a Macintosh Toolbox ROM chip
 New World (video game), 2021 video game
 New World, a brand of cooking appliances owned by Glen Dimplex

See also
 New World Order (disambiguation)
 New Worlds (disambiguation)
 Old World (disambiguation)